Ailill (Ailell, Oilioll) is a male name in Old Irish. It is a prominent name in Irish mythology, as for Ailill mac Máta, King of Connacht and husband of Queen Medb, on whom Shakespeare based the Fairy Queen Mab. Ailill was a popular given name in medieval Ireland, meaning something like "beauty".

Notables named Ailill
 Ailill Aulom, early 1st millennium druid and King of Munster 
 Ailill mac Máta, legendary King of Connacht and husband of Queen Medb
 Ailill mac Slanuill, legendary High King of Ireland of the 12th century BC
 Ailill Finn, legendary High King of the 8th century BC
 Ailill Caisfhiaclach, legendary High King of the 5th century BC
 Ailill mac Echach Mugmedóin, half-brother of Niall of the Nine Hostages (5th century AD)
 Ailill Molt, High King of the 5th century AD
 Ailill Inbanda (died c. 549), King of Connacht
 Saint Ailill the First, 6th century Bishop of Armagh
 Ailill the Second, 6th century Bishop of Armagh
 Ailill mac Rechtaide, 6th century patriarch of the Ó Faircheallaigh and the Ó Fearghuis
 Ailill Cruitire, 7th century King of Brega
 Ailill Medraige mac Indrechtaig (died 764), King of Connacht
 Ailill, 9th century Bishop of Clogher

References